Langloan Cricket Ground is a cricket ground in Coatbridge, Scotland.  The first recorded match held on the ground came in 1860 when Colonel Buchanan's Scotland Team played Ireland.  The ground held its first first-class match when Scotland played Ireland in 1980.  The ground held a further first-class match in 1985 when Scotland played the touring Zimbabweans.

The ground is still in use today by Drumpellier Cricket Club.

References

External links
Langloan Cricket Ground at ESPNcricinfo
Langloan Cricket Ground at CricketArchive

Cricket grounds in Scotland
Sports venues in North Lanarkshire
Coatbridge